The Women's Premier League (WPL) is a women's Twenty20 cricket franchise league in India. It is owned and operated by the Board of Control for Cricket in India (BCCI).

The first season is being played in Mumbai and Navi Mumbai, with five franchises taking part.

History 
The first major women's Twenty20 competition in India was the Women's T20 Challenge. This started as a single-match tournament in 2018, and was expanded to a three-team, three-match competition held in 2019, 2020 and 2022.

In February 2022, BCCI President Sourav Ganguly announced plans to establish a women's version of the Indian Premier League (IPL), the major men's Twenty20 franchise cricket competition in India, replacing the Women's T20 Challenge. By August plans were more advanced and in October the BCCI announced that they were considering a five-team tournament which would take place in March 2023. This league was informally known as the Women's Indian Premier League; on 25 January 2023, however, the BCCI officially named it the Women's Premier League.

On 28 January 2023, the BCCI invited bids for the league's title sponsorship rights until 2027. Tata Group won the bid for an undisclosed amount.

Organisation 

The league structure for the WPL is based on the structure of the IPL.

Initially there will be five teams. The sides will play against each other in a double round robin format, with the three teams finishing with the most points entering the playoff stages of the competition. The Board plans to increase the number of matches and franchises in future seasons if the league is a success.

The first season of the league is taking place from 4 March to 26 March 2023, and featuring 22 matches, all held at Brabourne Stadium and DY Patil Stadium in Mumbai. In each match a team may include maximum of five overseas players, one of whom must be from an ICC Associate Nation.

Tickets for matches are free to women during the first season. The league's mascot, Shakti, is a tigress wearing a sky blue cricket uniform. 

In the matches, each innings will have two strategic timeout of 5 minutes. A new rule has also been introduced for the first time in a T20 league, allowing both sides to review wide and no ball decisions to the 3rd umpire. This rule will also be implemented in the IPL from the 2023 season.

Franchises 

A number of companies responded to the sale of franchise rights which were sold for five years, from 2023 to 2027.

According to Jack Genovese of Ampere Analytics, a media research firm, the league is the world's second highest valued women's sports league just behind the Women's National Basketball Association in the United States.

Three of the five franchises, Royal Challengers Bangalore, Delhi Capitals and Mumbai Indians, also have teams in the men's IPL.

Financial background 
The BCCI intends to distribute 80% of the profits from the competition among the franchise owners during the first five years. For the next five seasons, 60% of the profits will be shared, and from seasons 11 to 15, 50% of the profits will be distributed. Additionally, 80% of the revenue from the central licensing rights for the competition will be shared with the franchises. Franchises will also generate revenue through merchandise, ticket sales and advertising.

Player auction
The first auction to purchase players for each franchise was held on 13 February 2023 at Mumbai. Around 1,500 players registered their names. Each franchise had  to spend and had to purchase between 15 and 18 players, six of whom could be overseas players.

In future seasons the purse size for each franchise will be increased by  each year. 

Broadcasting 
In January 2023, Viacom18, announced it had acquired the global media rights for TV and digital broadcasts for the tournament. The contract will run for five years and was worth . The initial season of the league is broadcasting in India on the Sports18 TV channel and the JioCinema app, both of which are owned by Viacom18. 

In the United Kingdom the first season is being broadcast on Sky Sports. Fox Sports Australia is broadcasting the season in Australia, Willow TV is doing so in the United States and Canada, and SuperSports owns the broadcasting rights in South Africa.

See also

 Women's Cricket Association of India – Former national governing body of women's cricket in India (1973–2007)
 Sport in India

Notes

References

Further reading

External links 

 

 
Twenty20 cricket leagues
Indian domestic cricket competitions
Recurring sporting events established in 2023
Cricket leagues in India
Women's sports leagues in India
Women's Twenty20 cricket competitions
Cricket in Mumbai
Professional sports leagues in India
Organisations based in Mumbai
2023 establishments in Maharashtra
Sports leagues established in 2023